Mayreder is a surname. Notable people with the surname include:

Julius Mayreder (1860–1911), Austrian architect
Karl Mayreder (1856–1935), Austrian architect
Rosa Mayreder (1858–1938), Austrian freethinker, author, painter, musician, and feminist

German-language surnames